Stéphane Santamaria (born 22 May 1977) is a French male canoeist who won 18 medals at senior level at the Wildwater Canoeing World Championships.

Medals at the World Championships
Senior

References

External links
 

1977 births
Living people
French male canoeists
Place of birth missing (living people)